Dambulla Aura, previously known as Dambulla Viiking and Dambulla Giants, are a franchise Twenty20 cricket team based in Dambulla, Sri Lanka, that competes in the Lanka Premier League (LPL).

In June 2021, Sri Lanka Cricket (SLC) terminated the franchise ahead of the 2021 Lanka Premier League, due to financial issues. In September 2021, the team changed their name to Dambulla Giants after changing owners.

Seasons

Sponsors

Current squad
 Players with international caps are listed in bold.

Administration and support staff

Statistics

Most runs 

Source: ESPNcricinfo, Last updated: 20  Dec 2021

Most wickets 

Source: ESPNcricinfo, Last Updated:20  Dec 2021

By season

 Last updated : 3 December 2022 
 Source :ESPN cricinfo

By opposition

 Last updated: 3 December 2022

See also
 Dambulla Viiking in 2020
 Dambulla Giants in 2021
 Dambulla Aura in 2022

References

External links
Official Website

2020 establishments in Sri Lanka
Cricket clubs established in 2020
Lanka Premier League teams
Dambulla Aura